The following outline is provided as an overview of and topical guide to extraterrestrial life:

Extraterrestrial life – is any type of lifeform, from prokaryotes to intelligent beings, that is neither native of Earth or transplanted from it. So far, no extraterrestrial life has ever been found.

Search
 Astrobiology
 Mars
 Viking lander biological experiments
 Meteorites
 Allan Hills 77005
 Allan Hills 84001
 Murchison meteorite
 Nakhla meteorite
 Shergotty meteorite
 Yamato 000593 
 Search for extraterrestrial intelligence
 Active SETI
 Allen Telescope Array
 Pioneer plaque
 Project Phoenix (SETI)
 SERENDIP
 Technosignature
 Xenoarchaeology
 Communication with extraterrestrial intelligence
 Arecibo message
 Astrolinguistics
 Wow! signal

Likely requirements
 Circumstellar habitable zone
 Extraterrestrial liquid water
 Planetary habitability

Potential locations
 Colonization of Europa
 Habitability of K-type main-sequence star systems
 Habitability of natural satellites
 Habitable exomoon
 Habitability of red dwarf systems
 Habitable exoplanet
 Earth analog
 Superhabitable planet
 Life on Mars
 Life on Titan
 Life on Venus
 Catalogs
 Catalog of Nearby Habitable Systems

Possible traits
 Extraterrestrial intelligence
 Alien language
 Hypothetical types of biochemistry
 Carbon-based life
 CHON
 Extremophile

Ideas
 Anthropocentrism
 Carbon chauvinism
 Copernican principle
 Cosmic pluralism
 Drake equation
 Fermi paradox
 Aestivation hypothesis
 Great Filter
 Rare Earth hypothesis
 Zoo hypothesis
 Kardashev scale
 Dyson sphere
 Mediocrity principle
 Potential cultural impact of extraterrestrial contact
 Exotheology
 Post-detection policy

Fringe and conspiracy theories
 Ufology
 Alien abduction
 Close encounter
 Contactee
 Extraterrestrial hypothesis
 UFO religion
 Ancient astronauts

Extraterrestrial life media 
Note: Only Nonfiction works in this section

 Books
 Alien Oceans
 Extraterrestrial: The First Sign of Intelligent Life Beyond Earth
 Rare Earth: Why Complex Life Is Uncommon in the Universe
 Documentaries
 Cosmos: Possible Worlds

Persons influential in extraterrestrial life 
 Giordano Bruno
 Frank Drake
 Enrico Fermi
 Michael H. Hart
 Stephen Hawking
 Avi Loeb
 Carl Sagan

Extraterrestrial life in fiction

 Extraterrestrials in fiction
 Alien language in science fiction
 Ancient astronauts in popular culture
 List of fictional extraterrestrials 
 List of alien races in DC Comics
 List of alien races in Marvel Comics
 List of Star Trek aliens
 List of Star Wars creatures
 Archetypes
 Bug-eyed monster
 Elder race
 Energy being
 Grey alien
 Insectoid
 Little green men
 Plots
 Alien invasion
 Big Dumb Object
 First contact
 Interstellar war
 Science fictional space warfare
 Space travel in science fiction

References 

 
Outlines of sciences